Tierra Bomba is a Colombian island off the coast of Cartagena de Indias. The island is within the legal administration of the municipality of Cartagena (City) in Bolívar Department, and covers a surface area of 19.84 km2 (1984.99 hectares) that house an estimated population of 9,000 people.

Naval Base
In January 2014, it was announced that Tierra Bomba Island will house the new Caribbean Naval Base of the Colombian Navy. The naval base will be within the locality of Bocagrande and be 33.4 hectares in size.

See also
 Caribbean region of Colombia

References

Caribbean islands of Colombia
Caribbean region of Colombia